Peterhead railway station is located on the Outer Harbor line. Situated in the north-western Adelaide suburb of Peterhead, it is 14.6 kilometres from Adelaide station.

History
Peterhead station opened in 1911, when the line was extended from Glanville to Outer Harbor. In the 1990s, there were moves to curtail the line at Glanville, providing alternate transport beyond there. As a result, a feeder bus was introduced to connect Outer Harbour to the train at Glanville and Ethelton, as well as allowing passengers to travel to Port Adelaide, Semaphore (which used to have its own branch from the main line) and West Lakes. That was later split into two routes, one staying west near Military Road, and the other servicing the eastern side of the Lefevre Peninsula along Fletcher and Victoria Roads. The plans to close the line were later scrapped, although the nearby 333 and 350 routes are a remnant of these original plans.

In late 2016, the station was ranked as one of the worst in the western suburbs, based on five criteria and, like many other old western and northern suburbs stations, it is subject to vandalism. In 2017, the shelter was replaced at the station, and a Rail Care art project is planned.

In July 2018, several signal cabinets next to the level crossing were painted with an ocean theme, along with a quotation from Jules Verne. A mural with an octopus and submarine followed in September.

Services by platform

References

Rails Through Swamp and Sand – A History of the Port Adelaide Railway.  M. Thompson  pub. Port Dock Station Railway Museum (1988)

External links

Railway stations in Adelaide
Railway stations in Australia opened in 1911
Lefevre Peninsula